Harper Fowlkes House is a historic building in Savannah, Georgia, United States. It is located at 230 Barnard Street, in the southeastern trust lot of Orleans Square, and was built in 1844. It is in the Greek Revival style.

History
A local shipping magnate, Stephen Gardner, hired architect Charles B. Cluskey to design the house. Gardner ran into financial difficulty, however, and sold the property to his brother, John, who then sold it to Aaron Champion. Aaron and Mary Jane Griggs Champion's only child, daughter Maria, married James Wallace McAlpin (1831–1905), and used the home for an entertaining venue while living at the Hermitage Plantation, two miles down the Savannah River. McAlpin became the trustee of the plantation in 1866 after Champion was forced to foreclose on it.

Upon Champion's death in 1880, the Barnard Street property was left to McAlpin, to be held in a trust for his daughter and their children: Aaron Champion (b. December 30, 1857), Henry (b. August 4, 1860), Mary Ellen (b. February 27, 1863), James Wallace Jr. (b. April 24, 1865) and Maria (b. January 31, 1869). 

Maria Champion McAlpin later owned 24 East Jones Street. She died on September 18, 1890. Five years later, the siblings sold their interest in the house to Henry.

Henry's first wife died. His second marriage, in 1895, was to Isabel Wilbur, of Philadelphia. Her father, Elisha, paid off the $15,000 mortgage on the property, before giving it to the newlyweds as a wedding gift.

Isabel renovated the house in 1895, to accommodate her five Irish servants, by adding a third floor and a mansard roof. She died in 1905. Henry survived her by 26 years, dying in April 1931. His third wife, Mary Auza McAlpin, and daughter by his first wife, Claudia McAlpin Whitney, were left equal shares of the property.

Alida Harper Fowlkes purchased the property via auction in October 1939, paying $9,000. She owned the Georgian Tea Room (now the Olde Pink House), on Reynolds Square, between 1930 and 1943. She died on January 18, 1985, aged 77, and in her will she ordered the property be held in a trust to the Society of Cincinnati in the State of Georgia.

Maria McAlpin Strong Nichols, granddaughter of Aaron Champion McAlpin, visited the property around 2015 at the age of 87. She died around 2019. The McAlpin family and its offshoots made a donation to the Harper Fowlkes House in 2018.

References

External links
Harper Fowlkes House official website
The architecture of the Harper Fowlkes House
The interior design and fabric details of the Harper Fowlkes House
Harper Fowlkes House – GoSouthSavannah
McAlpin House (Savannah, Ga.) – Digital Library of Georgia
Harper Fowlkes House – Coastal Heritage Society

Houses in Savannah, Georgia
Houses completed in 1844
Greek Revival houses in Georgia (U.S. state)
Orleans Square (Savannah) buildings
Savannah Historic District